The 2013 German Figure Skating Championships was held on December 21–22, 2012 at the Volksbank Arena in Hamburg. Medals were awarded in the disciplines of men's singles, ladies' singles, pair skating, and ice dancing on the senior, junior, and novice levels. The results are among the criteria used to choose the German teams to the 2013 World Championships and 2013 European Championships.

Medalists

Senior

Junior

Senior results

Men

Ladies

Pairs

Ice dancing

Junior results
The 2012–13 junior competition was held on January 9–13, 2013 at the Eislaufzentrum Oberstdorf in Oberstdorf.

Men

11 competitors in total and one withdrawal.

Ladies

32 competitors in total.

Pairs

Ice dancing

9 teams in total and two withdrawals.

Qualification results
After the national championships, the final European Championship qualification standings were published.

References

External links
 2013 German Championships: Senior results at the Deutsche Eislauf Union
 2013 German Championships: Junior and novice results at the Deutsche Eislauf Union
 Eislauf Union 
 Qualification standings 

German Championships
German Figure Skating Championships
Figure Skating Championships